Reiser's tyrannulet (Phyllomyias reiseri) is a species of bird in the family Tyrannidae. It is found in central Brazil and northern Paraguay. Its natural habitats are subtropical or tropical dry forests and subtropical or tropical moist lowland forests.

References

Reiser's tyrannulet
Birds of Brazil
Reiser's tyrannulet
Taxonomy articles created by Polbot